The following is a list of the 22 municipalities (comuni) of the Province of Caltanissetta, Sicily, Italy.

List

See also
List of municipalities of Italy

References

Caltanissetta